The Optimist's Daughter is a Pulitzer Prize for Fiction-winning short novel by Eudora Welty. It was first published as a long story in The New Yorker in March 1969 and was subsequently revised and published in book form in 1972.  It concerns a woman named Laurel, who travels to New Orleans to take care of her father, Judge McKelva, after he has surgery for a detached retina. Judge McKelva fails to recover from this surgery, and as he dies slowly in the hospital, Laurel visits and reads to him from Dickens.  Her father's second wife, Fay, who is younger than Laurel, is a shrewish outsider from Texas.  Her shrill response to the Judge's illness appears to accelerate his demise.  Laurel and Fay are thrown together when they return the Judge to his hometown, Mount Salus, Mississippi, where he will be buried.  There, Laurel is immersed in the  good neighborliness of the friends and family she knew before marrying and moving away to Chicago.  Fay, though, has always been unwelcome and leaves for a long weekend, leaving Laurel in the big house full of memories.  Laurel encounters her mother's memory, her father's life after he lost his first wife, and the complex emotions surrounding her loss as well as the many memories.  She comes to a place of understanding that Fay can never share, and she leaves small town Mississippi with the memories she can carry with her.

Summary
Laurel Hand, the main character, travels to New Orleans from her home in Chicago to assist her aging father as a family friend and doctor operates on his eye.  Laurel's father remains in the hospital for recovery for several months.  During this time, Laurel begins to get to know her outsider stepmother better, as she rarely visited her father since the two were married.  Fay begins to show her true self as the judge's condition worsens.  To the distress of all who knew him, the judge dies after his wife throws a violently emotional fit in the hospital and confesses to cheating and interest in his money.  
	
The two women travel back to the judge's home in Mount Salus, Mississippi for the funeral and are received by close friends of the family.  Here, Laurel finds love and friendship in a community which she left after childhood.  The warmth of the town clashes with Fay's dissenting and antagonistic personality.  Fay, a woman from Texas who claimed to have no family other than her husband, is soon confronted by her past as her mother, siblings, and other members of her family show up to her house to attend the funeral.  Though Laurel confronts Fay as to the reason why she lied, Laurel cannot help but feel anything except pity for the lonely, sullen woman.  Directly after her husband's funeral, Fay leaves to go back home to Madrid, Texas with her family.  
	
After her distraught and immature stepmother leaves, Laurel finally has time to herself in the house where she was raised, with the friends and neighbors she knew since childhood.  During the few days she remains, Laurel digs through the past as she goes through the house, remembering her deceased parents and the life she had before she left Mount Salus.  She rediscovers the life of friendship and love that she left behind so many years ago, along with heartache.   
	
Her visit to her hometown and the memories of her parents open up a new insight on life for Laurel.  She leaves Mount Salus with a new understanding of life and the factors which influence it the most—friends and family.  But most prominently, she gains a new understanding and respect for herself.

Main characters

Laurel Hand

Laurel is Judge McKelva's daughter, who is an only child. She is a widow who had been married to a man named Phil Hand. After his death, Laurel returned to her parents’ home because of her mother's sickness, before returning to Chicago, only to be brought back by her father's condition which is where the events in the novel begin. In the story Laurel and Fay have many arguments because of Fay's rude personality. After her father's death, the funeral, and Fay's unexpected vacation, Laurel returns to her childhood home. There, she reminisces about past memories, including those of her parents and her fear of birds before she comes to her epiphany about life.

Fay McKelva
Fay is Judge McKelva's second wife, and therefore, Laurel's stepmother. Judge McKelva met her at the Southern Bar Association at the old Gulf Coast hotel where Fay had a part-time job at the time. Fay is younger than Laurel. Fay's personality is not pleasant and causes everyone in the story to see her as obnoxious, self-centered, and rude. The other characters in the novel pity her. In the course of the story, we see that Fay is also dishonest, for one in saying that all of her family is dead.  This untruth comes to light when they arrive for Clint's funeral. After the funeral, Fay makes a snap decision to return to Texas with her family for a short time before returning at the end of the novel to take possession of her new home.

Judge (Clint) McKelva
Clint McKelva is Laurel's father. Judge McKelva is treated for an eye illness; he dies after eye surgery. He is a prominent and well-respected widower in Mount Salus, Mississippi. Ten years after the death of his wife, Becky, he marries a younger woman that he met at a Southern Bar Association conference named Wanda Fay. After his death, the home where his daughter and first wife lived out their lives is willed to Wanda Fay, and he leaves money to his daughter, Laurel, who works as a designer in Chicago.

Becky McKelva
Laurel's mother and Clint's first wife. She died before the events in the story occurred, but through the memories of Laurel, she plays a large role at the end of the story.

Setting
The Optimist's Daughter begins in New Orleans, Louisiana. The beginning of the novel takes place in a hospital in the bustling city during Mardi Gras. After the Judge passes, the majority of the novel is set in Laurel's childhood home, in her father's hometown of Mount Salus, Mississippi.

Symbolism 
The most prominent metaphor in The Optimist's Daughter is vision. Welty equates the ability to see with the ability to understand. Both of Laurel's parents suffered from failures of vision. Her mother, Becky McKelva slowly loses her vision as she approaches her death, and her father dies while attempting to recover from surgery for a detached retina. Additional images of vision persist throughout the novel. It not only contains several characters who suffer from blindness or poor vision but also images of vision or the lack of vision. Laurel is constantly noticing curtains, blinds, glasses, and windows. These remind her or her need to understand her present situation and the lack of understanding she has for her stepmother, Fay. Although not physically blind, Fay has poor vision in that she lacks the maturity to understand as is evidenced by her insensitivity towards others.

Sources

1972 American novels
American novellas
Novels by Eudora Welty
Pulitzer Prize for Fiction-winning works
Random House books
Southern Gothic novels
English-language books